The Nasdaq Vilnius is a stock exchange established in 1993 (Vilnius Stock Exchange, VSE) operating in Vilnius, Lithuania. It is owned by Nasdaq Nordic, which also operates Helsinki Stock Exchange and Stockholm Stock Exchange.
OMX Vilnius (OMXVGI) is a stock market index for the Nasdaq Vilnius Exchange.

History
VSE, together with Riga Stock Exchange and Tallinn Stock Exchange is part of the joint Baltic market that was established to minimize investing barriers between Estonian, Latvian and Lithuanian markets (OMX Baltic 10).

Trading day
It has a pre-market session from 08:45am to 10:00am, a normal trading session from 10:00am to 04:00pm and post-market session from 04:00pm to 04:30pm.

Companies 
As of June 15, 2018, market capitalization of Vilnius stock exchange equities was 3.9 billion euro, and consist of 30 companies.

Companies formerly listed on Nasdaq Vilnius

 Agrowill Group
 Akmenės cementas
 Alita
 Alytaus tekstilė
 Anykščių vynas
 Baltijos Laivų Statykla
 Bankas Hermis
 Biržų akcinė pieno bedrovė
 City Service
 Dirbtinis pluoštas
 Dvarčionių keramika
 DnB NORD bankas
 Ekranas
 Endokrininiai preparatai
 Kalnapilis
 Kauno pienas
 Kėdainių cukrus
 Kauno tiekimas
 Klaipėdos baldai
 Klaipėdos jūrų krovinių kompanija
 Krekenavos agrofirma
 Kuro aparatūra
 Lietkabelis
 Lietuvos dujos
 Lietuvos draudimas
 Lietuvos jūrų laivininkystė
 Limarko laivininkystės kompanija
 Lietuvos taupomasis bankas
 Lifosa
 Lisco Baltic Service
 Liteksas ir Calw
 Lithun
 Marijampolės pieno konservai
 Mažeikių elektrinė
 Mažeikių Nafta
 Mažeikių pieninė
 Medienos plaušas
 Metalo komercija
 Naftos terminalas
 Naujieji Verkiai
 Panevėžio pienas
 Panevėžio cukrus
 Pramprojektas
 Ragutis
 Sanatorija Eglė
 Sanitas
 Sema
 Snoras
 Stumbras
 Šiaulių oda
 Šiaulių stumbras
 Švyturys
 Trinyčiai
 Utenos gėrimai
 Ūkio bankas
 Šiaulių stumbras
 Viešbutis Lietuva
 Vilniaus bankas
 Vilniaus kailiai
 Vilniaus Pergalė
 Žiemys

See also
List of stock exchanges
List of European stock exchanges
Nasdaq Copenhagen
Nasdaq Stockholm
Nasdaq Helsinki
Nasdaq Nordic
Nasdaq Riga
Nasdaq Tallinn
Nasdaq Iceland

References

External links
 Official NASDAQ OMX Vilnius internet site 
 Internet forum on NASDAQ OMX Vilnius 
 Internet forum on NASDAQ OMX Vilnius 
 Equity Financing (NASDAQ OMX Vilnius)
Bloomberg page for VILSE:IND

Financial services companies of Lithuania
European stock market indices
Vilnius
Nasdaq Nordic
Stock exchanges in Europe
Companies based in Vilnius
Financial services companies established in 1993
1993 establishments in Lithuania